Abbas Abubakar Abbas (born 17 May 1996) is a Nigerian-born Bahraini athlete sprinter who competes internationally for Bahrain. He was the silver medallist in the 400 metres at the 2014 Asian Games. He has a personal best of 44.90 seconds for the event.

Career
Born in Kano State, Nigeria, he first established himself at the national level with a runner-up finish over 400 metres at the 2012 Nigerian National Sports Festival, finishing behind Orukpe Erayokan. Less than a month later the 16-year-old Nigerian opted to compete for Bahrain, changing his eligibility to the Middle-East state.

Abbas made his debut for his adopted nation the following year at the 2013 World Youth Championships in Athletics. Running in the 400 m, he managed a personal best in the qualifiers with a time of 46.85 seconds. In the final he originally finished in third place, but was disqualified for a lane infraction. He completed a 200 m/400 m double at the West Asian Youth Athletics Championships three months later.

At the start of following track season he was a double medallist at the Arab Junior Athletics Championships, winning the 200 m and placing second in a Bahraini 1–2 of the 400 m, behind Ali Khamis Abbas. He ran two personal bests in those events at the Plovdiv Memorial Vulpev-Bakchevanov that July, timing 21.25 seconds and 45.93 seconds, respectively. At the 2014 World Junior Championships in Athletics he was a 400 m finalist and despite a slow start managed to take the bronze medal – his first global podium finish. He rose among the senior elite runners at the 2014 Asian Games: two Bahraini junior records came in the qualifiers, first a run of 45.61, then one of 45.17 seconds. He was beaten Youssef Masrahi in the final by over a second, but was still a clear second to take the silver medal at the age of 18. His best time that year ranked him the second fastest junior 400 m runner for the season, just behind world junior champion Machel Cedenio.

Personal bests
200 metres – 21.25 seconds (2014)
400 metres – 45.17 seconds (2014)
400 meters - 44:90 seconds (2019)

References

External links

Living people
1996 births
Nigerian male sprinters
Bahraini male sprinters
Nigerian emigrants to Bahrain
Athletes (track and field) at the 2014 Asian Games
Athletes (track and field) at the 2018 Asian Games
Asian Games medalists in athletics (track and field)
Sportspeople from Kano State
World Athletics Championships athletes for Bahrain
Asian Games silver medalists for Bahrain
Athletes (track and field) at the 2016 Summer Olympics
Olympic athletes of Bahrain
Medalists at the 2014 Asian Games
Naturalized citizens of Bahrain
World Athletics Championships medalists
Sportspeople from Kano